Dwight Davis may refer to:
Dwight F. Davis (1879–1945), American tennis player
Delbert Dwight Davis (1908–1965), American zoologist
Dwight Davis (basketball) (born 1949), American basketball player

See also
Dwight Davis Tennis Center, St Louis, Missouri, USA